Laksha means hundred thousand or a lakh.

 Laksha Gala Sankeertanarchana, a Guinness record-breaking mass singing event held at Hyderabad
 Lakshadhikari, a 1963 Telugu drama film
 Lakshadweep, the smallest union territory of India